The 1995–96 Boston College Eagles men's basketball team represented Boston College as members of the Big East Conference during the 1995–96 NCAA Division I men's basketball season. The team was led by 10th-year head coach Jim O'Brien and played their home games at the Silvio O. Conte Forum in Boston, Massachusetts.

After finishing third in the Big East 6 Division regular season standings, the Eagles split a pair of games in the Big East tournament to receive an at-large bid to the NCAA tournament as No. 11 seed in the Southeast region. After defeating the No. 6 seed Indiana in the opening round, the Eagles were eliminated by Georgia Tech, 103–89, in the round of 32.

Roster

Schedule and results

|-
!colspan=12 style=| Regular season

|-
!colspan=12 style=| Big East tournament

|-
!colspan=12 style=| NCAA Tournament

Sources

Rankings

References

Boston College Eagles men's basketball seasons
Boston College Eagles
Boston College
Boston Coll
Boston Coll